Spiranthes romanzoffiana, commonly known as hooded lady's tresses (alternatively hooded ladies' tresses) or Irish lady's-tresses (Irish: Cùilìn Gaelach), is a species of orchid. Collected by Chamisso during the Romanzov expedition it was described by him in 1828 and named for Count Nikolay Rumyantsev who financed the expedition. This orchid is native to North America, Ireland and the British Isles.

Description
Hooded lady's tresses is a perennial plant with a fleshy rootstock. It sends up shoots with lanceolate leaves and three rows of flowers arranged in spirally twisted rows. Each scented flower has the sepals and petals united forming a lip of a tube. The labellum (or lower petal) of the flower is white with green veins.

The plant flowers in late summer. The flowers are pollinated by insects, and the tiny dust-like seed is distributed by the wind. However the plant can also reproduce vegetatively by means of root tubers which can grow new shoots while the old parts of the plant die. The orchid is associated with a mycorrhizal fungus which can provide it with essential nutrients.

Distribution and habitat
Hooded ladies' tresses was first described by the German botanist Adelbert von Chamisso. He named it in honour of his patron Nikolay Rumyantsev who had financed the scientific exploration to the Americas in 1815–1818 on which he found the orchid. It is common in North America, including Canada and the United States, but also grows in a few locations in Scotland and Ireland. It is now considered regionally extinct in England, but has recently (2019) been found in Wales. The first Irish record was made in 1810 in County Cork. Since then it has been found in a number of other locations in Ireland and Northern Ireland, including the Lough Neagh basin and the Mourne Mountains and the hills of Antrim. It grows along lakeshores and in damp pastures. The distribution pattern, occurring on both sides of the Atlantic Ocean, is puzzling.

References 

 Correll, D.S., Native Orchids of North America, p. 220. 1978.

Further references 

 Smith, J. E.  August 1834. English Botany, Supplement 2786. Copied to New Edition (1840), Volume 7, Page 13, Plate 1212**. "Neottia gemmipara, Proliferous Lady's Tresses"
 Horsman, F. 2013. The discovery and subsequent history of Spiranthes romanzoffiana Chamisso (Orchidaceae) at Castletown Bearhaven in West Cork (H3) ''Irish Naturalists' Journal 32 19 - 25.

External links 
 Ulster Museum Habitas
 Photo gallery

romanzoffiana
Plants described in 1828
Orchids of Canada
Orchids of the United States
Orchids of California
Orchids of Europe
Flora of Great Britain
Flora of the Northeastern United States
Flora of the Western United States
Flora of Subarctic America
Taxa named by Adelbert von Chamisso
Flora without expected TNC conservation status